Laisiasa Gataurua Vosailagi (born 25 November 1981), is a retired Fijian footballer who played as a midfielder. He represented Fiji at the 2003 South Pacific Games.

Career statistics

International

International goals
Scores and results list Fiji's goal tally first.

References

External links
 

1981 births
Living people
Fijian footballers
Suva F.C. players
Fiji international footballers
Association football midfielders
2004 OFC Nations Cup players